Ian Ritchie  (born 24 June 1947) is a British architect who founded Ian Ritchie Architects in 1981. His projects include the RIBA Award-winning Susie Sainsbury Theatre and Angela Burgess Recital Hall for the Royal Academy of Music, Sainsbury Wellcome Centre for Neural Circuits and Behaviour, University College London and the American Institute of Architects Award-winning Royal Shakespeare Company Courtyard Theatre. Ritchie was the first foreign architect to receive the French Academie d'Architecture Grand Silver Medal for Innovation.

Career
Born in Sussex, England, Ritchie graduated from Liverpool John Moores University School of Architecture in 1968. He went on to research Urban Studies for a year in Oita-Osaka, Japan and graduated with a Diploma in Architecture with Distinction from PCL, London (now University of Westminster) in 1972. After working with Norman Foster (1972–76), Ritchie spent two years in France designing and constructing projects before joining Arup's Lightweight Structures Group. (1978–81) In 1979, he founded Chrysalis Architects (1979–81) with Alan Stanton and Mike Davies. In 1981, he created Ian Ritchie Architects in London, and co-founded the design engineering firm Rice Francis Ritchie (RFR) with Peter Rice and Martin Francis in Paris. Before he left RFR in 1990, the practice had been responsible for major projects in Paris including the Bioclimatic Facades at La Villette Cité des Sciences and the Louvre Pyramids and Sculpture Courts with I M Pei. Alongside his work at Ian Ritchie Architects, Ritchie has held numerous public and professional appointments relating to his public policy interests in pan-disciplinary and environmentally intelligent design. He has acted in an advisory and teaching capacity to government, universities and charitable trusts, and regularly lectures on topics including art, urbanism and regeneration at venues worldwide.  Among other accolades, Ritchie was awarded a CBE in 2000, and was elected a Royal Academician in 1998 and Professor of Architecture at the RA Schools in 2004. Ritchie (and Ian Ritchie Architects) have received over 80 national and international award nominations and have been shortlisted four times for the RIBA Stirling Prize and EU Mies Award. Ritchie is an elected member of the Akademie der Künste, Berlin.

Major architectural projects
In 1999, Ian Ritchie Architects (alongside Scottish Homes and Thenew Housing Association) completed Scotland's Home of Tomorrow - new social housing for Glasgow's East End

Public and professional appointments (selected) 

Assessor, RIBA President's Medal & Regional Awards (1987–95)
Architectural & Design Advisor, Natural History Museum, London (1991–95)
Commissioner, Royal Fine Art Commission (1995–99)
President, Europan UK (1997-2003)
Commissioner, CABE (1999-01)
Advisor to the Lord Chancellor (1999-2004)
Education Advisor, The Ove Arup Foundation (2000–2018)
Governor and Design Advisor to the Board of the Royal Shakespeare Company (2001–2017)
Design Masterplanner to the British Museum (2004–06)
Member of the European Construction Technology Platform, High Level Group, Brussels (2005–08)
Chair of RIBA Stirling Prize (2006)
President's Manhattanville Advisor, Columbia University (2007–11)
Advisor to Dean of School of Architecture, Design & Construction, University of Greenwich (2011–2018)
Advisor to the Director Centre for Urban Science and Progress, New York University (2012–15)
Theatre Advisor, Backstage Trust (2012–present)

Educational appointments (selected)

Visiting Professor, Moscow School of Architecture (1992)
Visiting Professor, Technical University, Vienna (1994–95)
Special Professor, Leeds University School of Civil Engineering (2001–04)
Professor of Architecture, Royal Academy of Arts (2004–12)
Honorary Visiting Professor, Liverpool University (2009–present)

Awards and honours (selected) 

Fellow, Royal Society of Arts (1987)
Elected as Royal Academician (1998)
Commander of the Order of the British Empire (CBE) (2000)
French Academie d'Architecture Grand Medaille d'Argent for Innovation (2000)
Honorary Doctorate, University of Westminster (2000)
Honorary Fellow, Royal Incorporation of Architects in Scotland (2009)
Honorary Fellow, American Institute of Architects (2010)
Fellow, Society of Façade Engineering (2012)
Member, Academy of Arts, Berlin (2013)
Honorary Member, Society of Czech Architects (2018)
Honorary Fellow, Royal Academy of Music
Honorary Masters Degree, Polytechnic University of Milan (2019)

References

External links 
 

Living people
1947 births
Architects from Sussex
Academics of the University of Cambridge
Alumni of the University of Westminster
Royal Academicians
Members of the Academy of Arts, Berlin
Commanders of the Order of the British Empire
Fellows of the Royal Academy of Music